Kevin Coleman may refer to:

 Kevin Coleman (musician), drummer with Smash Mouth
 Kevin Coleman (soccer) (born 1998), American soccer player
 Kevin Coleman (politician), American politician from Michigan